Erpeldange-sur-Sûre is a commune and small town in north-eastern Luxembourg. It lies along the river Sûre, between Ettelbruck and Diekirch. It is part of the canton of Diekirch.

, the town of Erpeldange, which lies in the centre of the commune, has a population of 818.  Other towns within the commune include Burden and Ingeldorf

Erpeldange-sur-Sûre was formed on 1 July 1850, when it was detached from the commune of Ettelbruck, along with the commune of Schieren.  The law forming Erpeldange-sur-Sûre was passed on the 22 January 1850.

Erpeldange Castle now houses the commune's administrative offices. It has a history dating from the 13th century.

Population

References

External links

 Official Website for Erpeldange
 Official website of the Erpeldange tourist board
 Football club in Erpeldange
 Team III from the Football club in Erpeldange
 Erpeldange Youth association
 Band and Choir Concordia Erpeldange

Towns in Luxembourg
Communes in Diekirch (canton)